JZP150 (formerly PF-04457845) is an inhibitor of the enzyme fatty acid amide hydrolase (FAAH), with an IC50 of 7.2nM, and both analgesic and antiinflammatory effects in animal studies comparable to naproxen.

JZP150 is currently being developed by Jazz Pharmaceuticals and is in a Phase 2 trial in the US for PTSD.

See also 
 FAAH inhibitor
 4-Nonylphenylboronic acid
 LY-2183240
 URB-597
 BIA 10-2474, problems in phase 1

References 

Enzyme inhibitors
Trifluoromethyl compounds
Pyridazines
Pyridines